Centre Airpark  is a small airport in Centre Hall, Pennsylvania. With one grass runway, the airport is often used by ultralight aircraft.

See also 
 List of airports in Pennsylvania

References

External links 

Airports in Pennsylvania